Religion:
The Japanese Buddhist name and term for Wrathful deities, from which the name is reference to in its kanji, and is translated rather as fierce god rather than oni god.

In fiction:
Cloverfield/Kishin – a prequel manga to the 2008 film Cloverfield.
Kishin Corps – a series of light novels, manga and a mecha anime directed by Takaaki Ishiyama and Kazunori Mizuno.
Kishin Dōji Zenki – a supernatural manga and anime about a "Demon Child" that turns into a mighty warrior.
Masō Kishin – a term used to refer to four distinct mecha in the Super Robot Wars franchise.
Kishin Taisen Gigantic Formula – a Japanese anime series.
 In the manga and anime series Soul Eater, "Kishin" is an alias of the series antagonist Asura as well as Crona. It is also a term associated with humans who become monstrous creatures by devouring the souls of innocent people.

People:
Kishin Shinoyama – a Japanese photographer.
Keiichi Yamada – a Japanese professional wrestler who occasionally used the ring name "Kishin Liger".